Ensemble Pieces is a 1975 classical music work by Christopher Hobbs, John Adams and Gavin Bryars.

The work was the second release on Brian Eno's label Obscure Records, catalogue number Obscure no.2.

Track listing
 Christopher Hobbs ‘Aran’ (3:52)
 John Adams ‘John Philip Sousa’ (4:24)
 John Adams ‘Christian Zeal And Activity’ (11:38)
 John Adams ‘Sentimentals’ (2:49)
 Christopher Hobbs ‘McCrimmon Will Never Return’ (9:19)
 Gavin Bryars ’1, 2, 1-2-3-4′ (14:56)

Personnel

John Adams – composer, director of the New Music Ensemble of the San Francisco Conservatory of Music
Derek Bailey – guitar
Gavin Bryars – reed organ, triangles, wood blocks, cymbals, double bass, composer
Cornelius Cardew – cello
Stuart Deeks – violins
Brian Eno – vocals, producer
Celia Gollin – vocals
Andy Mackay – oboe
The New Music Ensemble of San Francisco Conservatory of Music – strings
Mike Nicolls – drums
Paul Nieman – trombone
John White – reed organ, toy piano, triangles, drums
Phil Ault – engineer
Alden Jenks – engineer

References

External links
Discogs entry on album

1975 compositions
Albums produced by Brian Eno
Brian Eno
Compositions by John Adams (composer)
Compositions by Gavin Bryars
Minimalistic compositions
Obscure Records albums